Rabbit Fur Coat is an album in collaboration by Jenny Lewis of Rilo Kiley, with The Watson Twins. It was released in the United States on January 24, 2006, by Team Love. Lewis has described the album as a "sort of soul record". The album contains a cover of the Traveling Wilburys song "Handle With Care", featuring Ben Gibbard (of Death Cab for Cutie), Conor Oberst (of Bright Eyes) and M. Ward.

Lewis embarked on her first solo tour to support the album, with Johnathan Rice and either Whispertown 2000 or The Blow opening. She also appeared on the Late Show with David Letterman, Jimmy Kimmel Live!, and The Late Late Show with Craig Ferguson in support of the album.

This album is the 8th release of Team Love Records.

Listeners of All Songs Considered, NPR's online music show, voted the album the eighth best of 2006.

A vinyl reissue of Rabbit Fur Coat was released in January 2016, marking its 10th anniversary. Lewis was also joined in early 2016 by M. Ward and The Watson Twins for a brief tour celebrating the anniversary.

Reception

Rabbit Fur Coat received generally favorable reviews and maintains a normalized rating of 78 out of 100 on Metacritic based on 24 professional reviews.

Actress Anne Hathaway was quoted in People as calling Rabbit Fur Coat "beautiful, funny, and very subversive".

Tracks
People noted that album's first track "Run Devil Run," was "old-time gospel" with Chandra and Leigh Watson providing a cappella backing. with other reviews calling the opener track "a breathy, gospel-tinged number" with a "blast of impassioned close harmony bluegrass-style vocals."

Two singles were released: "Rise Up With Fists!!" and "You Are What You Love".

Track listing
(all tracks written by Lewis except where noted)
 "Run Devil Run" – 1:06
 "The Big Guns" – 2:32
 "Rise Up with Fists!!" – 3:36
 "Happy" – 4:14
 "The Charging Sky" – 2:56
 "Melt Your Heart" – 2:50
 "You Are What You Love" – 2:51
 "Rabbit Fur Coat" – 4:32
 "Handle with Care" (Bob Dylan, George Harrison, Jeff Lynne, Roy Orbison, Tom Petty) – 2:56
 "Born Secular" – 5:07
 "It Wasn't Me" – 4:10
 "Happy (Reprise)" – 0:48

Charts

As of 2007, sales in the United States have exceeded 112,000 copies, according to Nielsen SoundScan.

Personnel

Jenny Lewis & The Watson Twins
Jenny Lewis – lead vocals, guitar
Chandra Watson – backing vocals
Leigh Watson – backing vocals

Musicians
James Valentine – guitar, keyboards, backing vocals 
Johnathan Rice – backing vocals 
Jason Boesel – drums
Mike Mogis – guitar, producer
Mickey Madden – bass
Greg Kurstin – producer, keyboards, backing vocals 
Mike Bloom – engineer
Matt Ward – guitar, keyboards, backing vocals, producer 
Larry Crane – engineer 
Michael Runion – photography 
Benjamin Gibbard – guitar, backing vocals 
Conor Oberst – guitar, backing vocals 
David Scher – backing vocals
Rachel Bloomberg – backing vocals

References

2006 debut albums
Jenny Lewis albums
The Watson Twins albums
Team Love Records albums
Albums produced by Mike Mogis